Michael Jackson Quiñónez Cabeza (born June 21, 1984 in Pedro Carbo, Guayas), is an Ecuadorian football attacking midfielder who plays for L.D.U. Portoviejo.

Club career
Quiñónez played for Ecuadorian clubs Quevedo and Espoli before moving to Santos. Santos signed him in February 2008, along with Colombian Mauricio Molina. He made his debut on February 13, 2008, starting against Cúcuta Deportivo of Colombia in the Copa Libertadores 2008. Michael Quiñónez scored his first goal for Santos on April 1, 2008, when his club beat Bolivian club San José 7–0 for the Copa Libertadores.

On January 6, 2009, he signed for 13-time Ecuadorian champions El Nacional.

International career
Despite his attention-gaining move to Brazilian football in 2008, Quiñonez was not noticed by national team coach Sixto Vizuete until March 2009, when he was called up for a friendly game against El Salvador. He made his debut as a left-side midfielder in the 3-1 loss to El Salvador. His prolific performances with El Nacional, however, have earned him another chance with the Ecuador national team, and he was called up to the squad to replace injured forward Carlos Tenorio for the extremely important last two 2010 FIFA World Cup qualifying fixtures against Uruguay and Chile.

References

External links
 

1984 births
Living people
People from Guayas Province
Association football midfielders
Ecuadorian footballers
Footballers at the 2011 Pan American Games
C.D. ESPOLI footballers
C.D. Quevedo footballers
Santos FC players
C.D. El Nacional footballers
S.D. Quito footballers
Barcelona S.C. footballers
L.D.U. Quito footballers
Mushuc Runa S.C. footballers
S.D. Aucas footballers
Ecuador international footballers
Ecuadorian expatriate footballers
Expatriate footballers in Brazil
Pan American Games competitors for Ecuador